This is a complete list of the Principals of Phillips Academy since its founding in 1778. From 1778 to 1928, the title was "Principal". In the year 1928, the name was changed to "Headmaster", and finally with the appointment of Barbara Landis Chase, the title was changed to "Head of School".

References 

Faculty by high school in the United States
Lists of American people by school affiliation
Lists of people by educational affiliation in Massachusetts
Schoolteachers from Massachusetts